Baltimore Tower, also known as Arena Tower and nicknamed The Slinky due to its resemblance to the popular toy, is a high-rise residential skyscraper in Millwall on the Isle of Dogs, London, England. The building is located on a site that was previously the location of the London Arena. The 45-storey building comprises 366 residential apartments and is 149 meters in height. It was designed by American architecture firm Skidmore, Owings & Merrill.

Planning application

Ballymore London Arena Ltd applied for an amended planning application to Tower Hamlets in 2008.

Gallery

See also
 List of twisted buildings

References

External links
 
 Building at The Skyscraper Center database

Canary Wharf buildings
Buildings and structures in the London Borough of Tower Hamlets
Residential skyscrapers in London
Skidmore, Owings & Merrill buildings
Twisted buildings and structures
Residential buildings completed in 2017
Millwall